W road may refer to :
 Roads in Java in Indonesia
 Corridor W, a road from Interstate 85 southwest of Greenville, South Carolina to Interstate 26 southeast of Hendersonville, North Carolina, US 25, as well as US 25 Truck near Hendersonville